Gbur is a surname. Notable people with the surname include:

Greg Gbur (born 1971), American author and physicist
Julian Gbur (1942–2011), bishop of the Ukrainian Catholic Eparchy of Stryi, Ukraine
Mary Flahive Gbur (born 1948), pseudonym for author Mary Flahive at Oregon State University